Wolfram Sperling (born 4 December 1952) is a retired German swimmer. He competed at the 1972 Summer Olympics in the 400 m freestyle and 200 m and 400 m individual medley and finished in eighth place in the last event. He  placed fourth in the 400 m and 1500 m freestyle at the 1970 European Championships.

Between 1973 and 1978 he studied sports sciences and after graduation worked at the DHfK in Leipzig, defending a PhD in 1982 and habilitation in 1990. He then taught various sports-related subjects at the University of Kiel (1993–1994) and University of Leipzig (1993–1998). In parallel he worked as a researcher in sports therapy. He is a member of the    German Association of Sport Sciences, President of the Saxon Swimming Federation, and a board member of the German Swimming Federation.

References

1952 births
Living people
German male freestyle swimmers
Male medley swimmers
Olympic swimmers of East Germany
Swimmers at the 1972 Summer Olympics
Swimmers from Leipzig